Black Hawk County is a county in the northeastern part of U.S. state of Iowa. As of the 2020 census, the population was 131,144, making it Iowa's fifth-most populous county. The county seat is Waterloo.

Black Hawk County is part of the Waterloo-Cedar Falls, IA Metropolitan Statistical Area.

History
Black Hawk County was formed on February 17, 1853, from sections of Buchanan County. It was named after Black Hawk, a Sauk leader during the 1832 Black Hawk War.

Geography

The Cedar River roughly divides the county in half from the northwest to the southeast corner. The land is mostly level since much of it is on the river's flood plain.

Major highways

 Interstate 380
 U.S. Highway 20
 U.S. Highway 63
 U.S. Highway 218
 Iowa Highway 21
 Iowa Highway 27
 Iowa Highway 57
 Iowa Highway 58
 Iowa Highway 175
 Iowa Highway 281

Transit
 Metropolitan Transit Authority of Black Hawk County
 List of intercity bus stops in Iowa

Adjacent counties
Bremer County (north)
Buchanan County (east)
Benton County (southeast)
Tama County (southwest)
Grundy County (west)
Butler County (northwest)
Fayette County  (northeast)

Demographics

2020 census
There were 58,559 housing units of which 54,223 were occupied.

2010 census
There were 55,887 housing units, of which 52,470 were occupied.

2000 census

At the 2000 census there were 128,012 people, 49,683 households, and 31,946 families in the county. There were 51,759 housing units at an average density of 91 per square mile (35/km2). The racial makeup of the county was 88.42% White, 7.95% Black or African American, 0.18% Native American, 0.98% Asian, 0.04% Pacific Islander, 0.93% from other races, and 1.49% from two or more races. 1.84%. were Hispanic or Latino of any race.

Of the 49,683 households 29.50% had children under the age of 18 living with them, 50.20% were married couples living together, 10.80% had a female householder with no husband present, and 35.70% were non-families. 27.10% of households were one person and 10.90% were one person aged 65 or older. The average household size was 2.45 and the average family size was 2.97.

Age spread:  23.10% under the age of 18, 15.70% from 18 to 24, 25.20% from 25 to 44, 22.00% from 45 to 64, and 14.00% 65 or older. The median age was 34 years. For every 100 females, there were 92.30 males. For every 100 females age 18 and over, there were 88.80 males.

The median household income was $37,266 and the median family income  was $47,398. Males had a median income of $33,138 versus $23,394 for females. The per capita income for the county was $18,885. About 7.90% of families and 13.10% of the population were below the poverty line, including 14.40% of those under age 18 and 8.90% of those age 65 or over.

Communities

Cities

Cedar Falls
Dunkerton
Elk Run Heights
Evansdale
Gilbertville
Hudson
Janesville
Jesup
La Porte City
Raymond
Waterloo

Census-designated place
Washburn

Other unincorporated communities
Blessing
Dewar
Eagle Center
Finchford
Glasgow
Voorhies

Townships
Black Hawk County is divided into seventeen townships:

 Barclay
 Bennington
 Big Creek
 Black Hawk
 Cedar
 Cedar Falls
 Eagle
 East Waterloo
 Fox
 Lester
 Lincoln
 Mount Vernon
 Orange
 Poyner
 Spring Creek
 Union
 Washington

Population ranking
The population ranking of the following table is based on the 2020 census of Black Hawk County.

† county seat

Politics
Black Hawk County has been a Democratic stronghold in Iowa since the late 1980s. In presidential politics, it is one of the most Democratic counties in Iowa. As the state swung hard to the right in the 2010s and 2020s, Black Hawk County -- as a major population center, in accordance with most other population centers nationwide -- has remained staunchly Democratic.

See also

National Register of Historic Places listings in Black Hawk County, Iowa
Impact of the 2019–20 coronavirus pandemic on the meat industry in the United States

References

External links

Black Hawk County government's website

 
Waterloo – Cedar Falls metropolitan area
1843 establishments in Iowa Territory
Populated places established in 1843